In Japan,  refers to anime series broadcast on television late at night or in the early hours of the morning, usually between 10 PM and 4 AM local time.

Overview
Late night anime is targeted towards Otaku from teens to adult audiences. One of the purposes of the late night broadcast is to promote DVDs or associated merchandise that are planned for release in the future. Other than original stories, many anime are based on manga, novels, or video games. The genres that tend to be preferred by anime fans include romantic comedies, slice of life stories, action, or sci-fi, but there are exceptions. Most series are broadcast for 3 months or 6 months with 12 to 13 episodes for each block of 3 months. With the exception of NTV programs, few titles have longer than these broadcast times.

In most cases, a production committee (a group of several related companies) buys a time slot from a TV station. This process is known as brokered programming, and is similar to how infomercials are broadcast. Therefore, unlike ordinary programs, production companies are sponsoring companies as well. This way, TV stations can fill the time slots with low viewership, while production companies can advertise their products (anime DVDs) at a lower cost. Since a production’s purpose is to promote the title to fans, low ratings or a lack of sponsors are of little concern. Consequently, the number of late night anime is increasing. The fact that they rely on the sales of DVDs means that these anime are virtually the same as OVAs, except that they get a chance to be promoted. This is why "pure" OVA series have decreased rapidly.

Differences between TV and DVD versions
When a late night anime is released on video or DVD, it tends to have the contents altered or expanded, such as:
Improved animation quality
Uncensored scenes
Completely new videos added, such as side stories or epilogues
Extras, like commentaries by the cast or production staff, may also be added.

Such alteration often happens for television series, but this tendency is especially prominent for late night anime, because:
Production companies may not have enough time, or a large enough budget, to make a higher quality series in time for television transmission.
They often may want to include sexual or violent content that are restricted for broadcast on television.
They have to add value for the DVD release, since they mainly rely on DVD sales.

Broadcast area
As of July 2006, there are 67 late night titles being broadcast, out of 95 total anime titles. This number includes those broadcast by satellite and UHF stations as well. However, not all are broadcast nationwide. Tokyo, for instance, has 49 late night anime series being broadcast. In Okinawa, only three of them are on the air.

In many cases, the title is broadcast only in the area of the station producing the anime (which, in most cases, is Tokyo). In other cases, they are only broadcast in Tokyo, Osaka, and Nagoya. UHF anime tends to be broadcast in Osaka, Nagoya, and the Kantō regions, but not in Tokyo. There are some titles that are broadcast nationwide, but such cases are the exception, not the rule. In other areas, variety shows with local tarento are often popular, making anime's entry difficult. This is especially the case in Hokkaidō, where Yo Oizumi and his program are extremely popular.

If a household has access to CS satellite or cable television, the situation becomes a little better, because anime-oriented pay CS satellite stations such as Kids Station, Animax, or AT-X broadcast many of those titles. However, their broadcastings are often weeks or months behind the first run. Moreover, satellite and cable television are not as common in Japan when compared to the United States.

However, this situation is changing thanks to the increase of households which can watch BS satellite broadcasting. In November 2011, about 72 percent of Japanese can watch principal BS satellite broadcasting without charge such as BS11, BS-TBS, BS Fuji and BS TV Tokyo. As a result, the number of UHF anime broadcast by BS11 is increasing, and in 2012, BS11 broadcasts most of them. Moreover, BS11 broadcasts late night anime less than eight days behind the first run. As to major network stations, since 2001, BS-TBS (previously called BS-i) has broadcast most of TBS's anime, though it did not broadcast K-On!!, which was broadcast by all JNN terrestrial broadcasting stations, and from 2006 to 2012, BS Fuji had broadcast most Fuji TV's late night anime. However, in 2013, BS Fuji stopped broadcasting Fuji TV's late night anime, and BS Japan (now known as BS TV Tokyo), which is a subsidiary of TV Tokyo, seldom broadcasts TV Tokyo's anime.

History

All of them were transmitted on Fuji TV. Sennin Buraku was from the longest running manga ever, still published in an adult magazine called Weekly Asahi Geinō. Lemon Angel was an adult anime that is a spin-off of the adult OVA Cream Lemon. Super Zugan was from a manga about mahjong. Those titles received some attention, but remained single experimental programs.

The title considered to be the true pioneer of late night anime is Those Who Hunt Elves (1996) on TV Tokyo. At the time, several late-night radio talk shows hosted by various voice actors were popular. As a genre, those programs were called "aniraji", the abbreviation of anime and rajio (radio). TV producers thought that if anime-related radio programs on late night can be popular, then anime television programs on late night should work too. The result turned out as they wished. Because of this, TV Tokyo continued their late night time slots. In 1997, the time slots were expanded, and they became the basis of the "late night anime" that we now know. At the time, following the immense success of Neon Genesis Evangelion, the number of produced anime rapidly increased. Many of those titles came to late night slots. Nippon TV also started their late night anime with Berserk.

In 1998, Fuji TV restarted their late night anime. Also, BS satellite station WOWOW started their block with the complete version of Cowboy Bebop which had been incompletely broadcast in TV Tokyo's evening time slot.

The first UHF late night anime, Legend of Basara, started that year as well. However, the true rise of UHF anime came with Comic Party (2001). In 2001, BS digital station BS-i began their time slot with Mahoromatic, making the cute title one of its killer contents.

In 2002, Fuji TV increased the number of programs that they broadcast. However, they did not value the otherwise filler programs with nearly zero ratings. Schedules of their late night anime became extremely unstable. For instance, when a program was on the air at 2:25 A.M., the next week it was on the air at 1:55 A.M. The week after, it was not broadcast, and the next week, two episodes were shown at 3:05 A.M. An extreme case was the last week of Kanon, for which they broadcast the last three episodes in a marathon. Anime fans heavily criticized this attitude, and production companies began to avoid broadcasting on Fuji TV. The number of late night anime on Fuji TV has decreased, and in October 2004, it completely disappeared. However, from April 2005, they started the time block called Noitamina, the block aimed for a young adult female audience, who otherwise would not watch anime. However, non-Noitamina anime, such as Mushishi, still do not get a proper screening.

Late night anime with adults as the target demographic has caused a rise in sales of anime shows to television stations in Japan in recent years. This type of anime is less popular outside Japan, being considered "more of a niche product".

Current tendencies of the major nationwide networks

NHK General, NHK Educational
NHK is the only public broadcasting station in Japan. They do not usually broadcast late night anime on weekdays, except for re-runs. However, they broadcast late night anime on Sunday nights.
NTV
They mainly show anime designed for non-otaku audiences, but the titles still appeal to anime fans as well. Also, they aired titles with many episodes, such as Monster or later episodes of Hunter × Hunter.
Their anime programs nowadays air on Tuesday nights under the AnichU block. Until recently, they aired late night anime on Wednesday, Friday, and Saturday nights.
TV Asahi
They used to rarely air late night anime, most recent of which are From the New World and Yuri on Ice.
However, they are airing late night anime on Saturday nights under the NUMAnimation block (from April 2020, starting with Sing "Yesterday" for Me), and on Sunday nights under the ANiMAZiNG!!! block (from October 2020, starting with Iwa-Kakeru! Climbing Girls).
TBS
It is notable that some of the titles they produce are not broadcast on TBS, but on BS-TBS (a satellite channel affiliated to TBS) or on UHF stations.
Starting from April 2018, their late night anime block called Animerico airs on Thursday nights, though they have since abolished the block from October 2021 onwards (starting with Platinum End) and have retained the usual Thursday night timeslots.
TV Tokyo
TV Tokyo always had to explore programs for niche audiences. Such genres include financial news, travel, jidaigeki (samurai fiction), outdoors, pets, and anime. Among major network stations, more than half of the anime titles are broadcast on this channel. As such, their late night anime usually aired on Sunday, Monday, Tuesday, Friday and sometimes Thursday nights, are abundant with wide varieties. 
Starting from October 2021, their late night anime block called Anime Zone airs on Monday until Wednesday nights. In addition to the shows on Anime Zone, TV Tokyo continues to air late night anime on Monday and Friday, and sometimes on Saturday and Sunday.
Fuji TV
Other than the Thursday late night Noitamina block, they used to broadcast anime on Friday nights; an example of this would be Assassination Classroom. They also broadcast another anime block called +Ultra that airs on Wednesday nights.
Tokyo MX
Among Japanese TV networks, they tend to broadcast the most late night anime.
Their Anime no Me block used to air on Monday nights alongside Yomiuri TV, but since April 2018, it is no longer active.
There are usually anime titles produced by Kadokawa that airs on Tuesday, Wednesday, Friday, and Sunday nights, and sometimes on Monday and Thursday nights.
There were anime titles produced by Avex Pictures that aired on Thursday nights, but recently most such shows have been airing on TV Tokyo, while the shows on Tokyo MX do not necessarily air on Thursday nights.
There is usually an anime title produced by Warner Bros. that airs on Friday nights.
There are usually anime titles produced by Aniplex and King Records that airs on Saturday nights. Starting from October 2019, shows produced by Aniplex air on Friday nights, while also having a show on Wednesday nights that is usually a rebroadcast of an Aniplex show, but will occasionally be for a new show.
There are usually anime titles produced by Toho Animation and Bandai Visual that airs on Sunday nights.
MBS
A Kansai-affiliated station of TBS that, besides Friday late night block Animeism, also broadcasts anime on Saturday nights, such as the first two seasons of Attack on Titan or Blood Blockade Battlefront.

Censorship
Japanese TV stations do not have a clear detailed system of parental guidelines. The only clear rule is that, except in the case of a prepubescent boy, they cannot show sexual organs. However, they do have many tacit understandings of self-restriction. Bare breasts, for example, are difficult to broadcast on prime time.

TV Tokyo once broadcast radical programs such as Evangelion during the evening. However, in 1997, they had "Pokémon-shock", the incident that caused many children to feel ill by watching the Pokémon episode that contained many flashing lights. After the incident, TV Tokyo's self-restriction codes became much more strict.
Now, TV Tokyo and Fuji TV are said to be extremely strict on sexual descriptions. Naked bodies are censored, and female underwear is censored as well. Even when a female character with a mini-skirt jumps, her skirt does not whip, which is often ridiculed by fans. These censorships on VHFs have become one of the primary reasons of the rise of UHF anime.

Outside Japan
Late night animation are also distributed worldwide, but a lot of titles do not make it into the airwaves and are only available in DVD, Blu-ray or legal Internet streaming releases. Animated series which have been aired at late night in Japan may be aired at more convenient times in other countries, be it on free-to-air or paid channels such as Anime Network or Animax.

In the United States, Cartoon Network relaunched their then-defunct Toonami block as a part of its nighttime programming block Adult Swim on May 26, 2012 — which continues as a late-night Saturday anime action block from its forerunner, Midnight Run. The Toonami relaunch on Adult Swim was itself a rebranding of Adult Swim Action, which was also a late night Saturday block that primarily ran action anime, although with a much shorter block schedule that would typically be around three hours long on average.

Some mainstream titles which are aired either at daytime or prime time in Japan may end up in late night slots overseas due to stricter local television regulation. Examples include popular titles such as Bleach and Fullmetal Alchemist which were aired in the evenings in Japan, but at late night in the United States. In Hong Kong, Dragon Ball Z was deemed as "mature" and aired in the weekend midnight slot, although it was considered appropriate for young viewers elsewhere in the world including Japan, the Philippines, and the U.S.  Due to the controversial nature of Death Note, Philippine animation channel Hero aired it near midnight, and only on weekends, with no rerun schedules.  They use the same scheme when they started airing censored versions of titles with ecchi, like Date A Live and The Fruit of Grisaia.

Rise of UHF anime
In Kantō region including Tokyo, the major nationwide network stations broadcast on analog on the VHF channels . The "independent" stations established to provide prefecture-specific programming broadcast on the UHF channels. They are members of the Japanese Association of Independent Television Stations. In Osaka the situation is similar with exception of TV Osaka (note that all the Japanese terrestrial television have switched to UHF digital).

However, because these UHF stations are obscure, they do not have strong restrictions. Also, their time slots were much cheaper than those of VHF stations. Avoiding strict restrictions by a nationwide television network, and avoiding random scheduling by Fuji TV, many anime, especially those with a lot of fan service, began to be broadcast on UHF stations. This even more obscure method still proved to be fairly effective, and UHF anime time slots continued to expand, especially from 2001 onward. In 2006, if UHF stations are to be treated as one network (which they are not), it now broadcasts the largest number of late night anime (16), even more than TV Tokyo (8). However, many shows suffer from lower budgets compared with VHF shows.

Because of loose self-restriction codes, many of the titles contain sexual or violent expression that is impossible to broadcast on VHF stations. Nevertheless, as UHF anime continue to expand, they recently have more varieties. , a show which can be watched by young children, is a UHF late night anime, too. As  became a huge hit, UHF late night anime has lost the description of "the cheapest, but the most obscure option".

Similar tendencies can be seen in other channels as well, such as WOWOW, BS-TBS, and CS channels on SkyPerfecTV!. It is notable that AT-X, a pay-channel on SkyPerfecTV!, broadcast Elfen Lied unedited. It is on WOWOW and BS-i, as well as other CS channels, that the rest of Asia who can receive their signal gets a view of these UHF anime.

See also
UHF anime
:ja:深夜アニメ一覧 Japanese list of late night anime titles
:ja:UHFアニメ一覧 Japanese list of UHF anime titles

References

Further reading
Otaku O'Clock - a TV Tropes article discussing the matter
アキバ王に聞く—オタクカルチャーと秋葉原の関係（後編）
誰がキラーコンテンツを殺しているのか？ 第5回　日本のアニメは米国でキラーコンテンツになれるのか？（前編）
深夜アニメ
NIPPON TV TO DISTRIBUTE ANIME ONLINE at activeAnime via the Wayback Machine
 Sci Fi builds late-night anime block

Anime and manga terminology
Anime television
Otaku